Tareq Kamleh is an Australian citizen who fled to Syria as a medical doctor to join the Islamic terrorist organisation ISIS, where he performed paediatric work in Raqqa, Syria, in the Islamic State Health Service. On 29 April 2015 Kamleh was brought to Australian Government and media attention for a propaganda video he posted from Raqqa, Syria. The recruitment video was titled “health services in the Islamic state”, and includes Kamleh, among other medical professionals, urging fellow Muslim ‘brothers and sisters’ to join the Islamic state. Kamleh is currently wanted by the Australian Federal Police in connection to crimes carried out in Raqqa, Syria. Tareq Kamleh's whereabouts are currently unknown, although it is presumed he is dead.

Early life and education 
Tareq was born in 1985 in Perth, Western Australia. His father was born and raised in Palestine, before migrating to Australia. His mother was born in Germany, before migrating to Australia. She was Catholic, prior to converting to Islam. Tareq was an only child. As a child, Tareq Kamleh attended a local primary school in Perth, Western Australia. He was raised in Perth for most of his childhood. At 20, Kamleh travelled to New Zealand to attend Otago University. Kamleh's goal was to get into the medicine school at Otago University. Kamleh failed to proceed into Medicine at Otago University and was dismissed as a ‘playboy’ who drank a lot. Tareq then departed Dunedin back to Australia where he later joined University of Adelaide, graduating with a Bachelor of Medicine and Surgery in 2010.

Tareq Kamleh was known to peers as somewhat of a playboy in his youth. He had multiple romantic affairs and drank alcohol prolifically. Despite preaching to be an abiding Muslim, where it is prohibited and impure to consume alcohol, he drank regularly. Kamleh was also somewhat of a ‘womanizer’ and had many different female partners.

Career
Kamleh graduated with a Bachelor of Medicine and Surgery from University of Adelaide in 2010. He was assigned to Women and Children's Hospital in the paediatric unit in February 2011. After two years, Kamleh transferred to Mackay Base Hospital in Queensland from January 2013. During this time, Kamleh also worked at Alice Springs Hospital. Kamleh was a registered doctor in Western Australia prior to 2015. Consequent to Kamleh's recruitment video posting for the Islamic state, the Medical Board of Australia confirmed on 21 June 2015 that it would be suspending the medical registration of Dr Tareq Kamleh. The board deemed this suspension was due to ‘manage serious risk to public health and safety’.

Joining ISIS 
Tareq Kamleh fled Australia in April 2015, flying to Turkey before crossing the border illegally into Syria. This was first brought to Australian Government attention after Kamleh appeared in a recruitment video for ISIS. ISIS used Tareq Kamleh in a recruitment video as a tool to recruit more western doctors and nurses to fight for their cause, one of ISIS main recruitment strategies. Kamleh provided medical aid in the paediatric division in the Raqqa hospital, boasting a state-of-the-art facility in his recruitment video. Kamleh appeared in another video in 2017 with a long beard, a bulletproof vest on and an AK-47, fighting for the ISIS cause.

After joining the organization, Kamleh used the name Abu Yosef Al-Australie, aka Abu Yusuf. This name change was of cultural significance to Tareq Kamleh, protesting his Australian citizenship whilst converting to Islam to fight for ISIS. He was also nicknamed him Dr Jihad by the media.

Consequent to fleeing Australia, Tareq Kamleh engaged in a relationship with Ariel Bradley. Bradley was an American woman who fled Tennessee to fight for the Islamic state and was previously married to Yasin Mohammad, who was killed in an airstrike in 2015. Ariel Bradley and Tareq Kamleh got married after Mohammad was killed. Bradley believed it was her civic duty to marry an Islamic state fighter to support the cause.

ISIS 
The Islamic state of Iraq and Syria (ISIS) is a jihadist terrorist group with a violent agenda and ideologies. ISIS holds religious authority over Muslims, and is the most successful terrorist organisation ever in attracting foreigners to join the ranks, thanks to their recruitment methods. ISIS will often look for foreigners whose ideologies can easily be exploited and manipulated, as well as foreigners looking for ego or adventure. In Tareq Kamleh's case, ISIS effectively manipulated his religious beliefs and ego, attracting him to join the cause. ISIS also use foreign recruits in recruitment videos to attract more foreign fighters. Kamleh can be seen in a recruitment video, asking for his foreign Muslim "brothers and sisters" to join the cause.

Syria and ISIS 
 
Syria is a country located in the Middle East, neighbouring countries like Lebanon and Iraq. Syria was also a stronghold for the ISIS terrorist organisation, which occupied about a third of its territory at its peak in 2017. ISIS forces had a headquarters located in Raqqa, the ISIS stronghold of Syria. Raqqa was a strategic base for ISIS, occupying the northern parts of Syria and Iraq along a corridor from Aleppo, Syria to Diyala, Iraq. When Kamleh fled Australia, he made his way to Raqqa to operate in the local paediatric hospitals. 

Kamleh reportedly kept a journal during his time in Raqqa, which was found during a gun fight in the city's west. The journal was retrieved by a British soldier during the raid of an ISIS safehouse and had Kamleh's name on it. The journal professed Kamleh's feelings about the war, claiming he was unhappy with ISIS refusal to support the orphanages with funding from the cause. Kamleh also complained in his alleged journal about his fear for the future of the caliphate due to animal abuse from other Jihadists.

In September 2017, a U.S.-backed coalition of Syrian Kurds and Arabs known as the Syrian Democratic Forces recaptured key locations within Syria, including Raqqa. This was the location Kamleh was reportedly killed during the air strikes. By October 2017, ISIS had lost 95% of its total territory, including its stronghold, Raqqa.

Later life and death 
Tareq Kamleh is currently wanted by the Australian Federal Police for crimes of terrorism and faces up to 25 years in jail if he returns to Australia. An arrest warrant has been filed for Tareq Kamleh in Adelaide, Australia, claiming offences he apparently committed in Raqqa in 2015 after fleeing Australia, including joining and aiding a terrorist organization.

Tareq Kamleh was reported to have died during the battle of Raqqa in September 2017, reported by multiple Islamic state fighters on their Twitter accounts. Whilst this death has not been confirmed by reliable sources, it was proposed he either died in the bombings of Raqqa in late 2017 or was taken prisoner by the Syrian Democratic Forces. This is less likely as his capture should have been reported on by now. Lastly, it is possible Kamleh fled Raqqa and is still at large. These three possibilities were reported by different Islamic state fighters.

See also
List of fugitives from justice who disappeared

References 

21st-century Australian criminals
Australian paediatricians
Australian people of German descent
Australian people of Palestinian descent
Criminals from Western Australia
Fugitives wanted by Australia
Fugitives wanted on terrorism charges
Islamic State of Iraq and the Levant members from Australia
Possibly living people
University of Adelaide alumni
Year of birth missing (living people)